The election of Members of Parliament (MPs) to the 6th Parliament of the Fourth Republic was held on 7 and 8 December 2012. The Speaker is not an elected member of parliament though he/she is qualified to stand for election as such. There are a total of 275 constituencies in Ghana. 45 new constituencies were created prior to the 2012 election. The 6th Parliament shall have its first sitting on Monday 7 January 2013 at "five minutes past twelve midnight" (12:05 GMT) to elect a Speaker and Deputy Speakers as well as for the administration of Oaths to the Speaker and Members of Parliament.

Current composition
Results from 275 constituencies are shown in the table below.

Current composition due to by-elections. The last by-election was the Talensi by-election which was conducted on 7 July 2015.

List of MPs elected in the general election
The following table is a list of MPs elected on 7 and 8 December 2012, ordered by region and constituency. The previous MP and previous party column shows the MP and party holding the seat prior to the election.



Changes
 Henry Ford Kamel, MP for Buem and Minister for the Volta Region in the Mahama NDC government died suddenly on 25 December 2012 at Jasikan.
 Joseph Boakye Danquah Adu, the NPP MP for Abuakwa North constituency, was murdered at his home on 9 February 2016.

By-elections
Akatsi South constituency - 5 February 2013 - Edward Adjaho of the NDC became the Speaker of Parliament on 7 January 2013 triggering a by-election. Bernard Ahiafor of the NDC won by a majority of 3,767 votes (18.2%) to become the new MP.
Buem - 26 February 2013 - Due to the death of Henry Ford Kamel of the NDC, a by-election was scheduled for late February 2013. This was won by Daniel Kosi Ashiaman of the NDC with a majority of 8,640 (78%) votes.
Kumbungu - 30 April 2013 - Due to Alhaji Mohammed Mumuni vacating his seat to take up the position of Secretary-General of African, Caribbean and Pacific States, a by-election was held to elect his replacement. The seat was contested by the NDC, CPP and PPP. Amadu Moses Yahaya of the CPP, won with over 2,000 votes from his nearest competitor, Imoro Yakubu Kakpagu of the NDC. This becomes the first seat won by the CPP in the current parliament.
Talensi - 7 July 2015 - Following Robert Nachinab Doameng (NPP) becoming the Paramount Chief of Tongo, a by-election was held resulting in Benson Tongo Baba of the NDC being elected MP for Talensi with a margin of 3521.
Amenfi West - 15 December 2015 - A by-election was held to replace the late John Gyetuah of the NDC who died after a protracted illness. Eric Afful also of the NDC, won the seat with 52.64% of the vote. The closest in the election was Paul Dekyi of the NPP who had 43.54% of the total votes cast.
Abuakwa North - 29 March 2016 - Following the death of J B Danquah Adu of the NPP, a by-election was conducted by the Electoral Commission of Ghana at the end of March 2016. The election on 29 March 2016 was worn by Gifty Twum Ampofo of the NPP, who won 89.6% of the total votes cast. The NDC did not take part in this election out of respect to J B Danquah Adu. Isaac Quartey of the United Front Party won 8.05% of the votes and Samuel Frimpong of the Ghana Freedom Party won 2.35% of the votes.

Notes and references

See also
2012 Ghanaian parliamentary election
Parliament of Ghana
Edward Adjaho - Speaker of the 6th parliament of the 4th Republic.

External links and sources
2012 parliamentary election results on MyJoyOnline
2012 parliamentary election results on Ghana Home Page

2012